This is a list of notable events in music that took place in the year 1989.



Specific locations
1989 in British music
1989 in Norwegian music
1989 in American music

Specific genres
1989 in country music
1989 in heavy metal music
1989 in hip hop music
1989 in Christian

Events
January 14 – Paul McCartney releases Снова в СССР (Back in the USSR) exclusively in the USSR. Bootleg copies sell for as much as US$1,000 in the United States.
January 23 – James Brown is sentenced in Georgia, USA, to six years in jail in connection with a police chase through two different states.
January 27 – Michael Jackson ends the Bad World Tour in Los Angeles, USA.
February 12 
Roy Orbison joins Elvis Presley as the only singers to ever simultaneously have two top 5 albums on the Billboard charts.
Tiny Tim launches an unsuccessful campaign to be elected mayor of New York City, USA.
February 17 – Whitesnake's David Coverdale marries Tawny Kitaen.
February 22 – The 31st Annual Grammy Awards are presented in Los Angeles, hosted by Billy Crystal. George Michael's Faith wins Album of the Year, while Bobby McFerrin's "Don't Worry, Be Happy" wins both Record of the Year and Song of the Year. Tracy Chapman wins Best New Artist.
March 21 – Madonna's "Like a Prayer" music video, taped in late December 1988, attracts criticism for its use of Catholic Church iconography and for the use of cross burning imagery, but also garners praise for its interpretation of discrimination, rape, and faith. Pepsi drops Madonna as a spokesperson out of fear the video will cause religious groups to boycott the company.
April 9 – The Rolling Stones' Bill Wyman announces that he will marry 19-year-old Mandy Smith, his girlfriend for six years.
April 12 – Michael Jackson is named "King of Pop" after receiving the Soul Train Heritage Awards.
April 28 – Jon Bon Jovi marries his high school sweetheart Dorothea Hurley at the Graceland Wedding Chapel in Las Vegas, Nevada, USA.
May 1 – California, USA jewelry store employees called the police reporting a suspicious person hanging around their store. The person turns out to be Michael Jackson shopping in disguise.
May 6 — The 34th annual Eurovision Song Contest, held at Palais de Beaulieu in Lausanne, is won by Yugoslavian band Riva, with the song "Rock Me". This is the first year a Balkan country has won the contest, and is also the only win for Yugoslavia as a unified state.
July 9 – All four original members of The Monkees reunite in Los Angeles, USA, for a concert performance at the Universal Amphitheatre. The following day the quartet attend an induction ceremony at the Hollywood Walk of Fame, where they receive a star.
July 23 – Former Beatle Ringo Starr forms his own band named Ringo Starr & His All-Starr Band.
July 29 – The Bee Gees perform in the U.S. for the first time in 10 years as part of their One for All world tour.
August 3 – Sergio Franchi collapses before scheduled concert; dies 9 months later of brain cancer.
August 11-12 – The Moscow Music Peace Festival is held in the Soviet Union. The event is put together by Doc McGhee and the Make-A-Wish Foundation and headline acts include Bon Jovi, Ozzy Osbourne, Mötley Crüe, Skid Row, Cinderella, and the Scorpions.
August 31 – The Rolling Stones open their Steel Wheels North American tour in Philadelphia, USA.
September 9 
The Morton H. Meyerson Symphony Center, designed by I. M. Pei, opens in Dallas, Texas, USA.
Madonna gives a risqué performance at the 1989 MTV Video Music Awards. Clad in baggy black sweatpants and a black bustier, she shocks the audience by simulating masturbation. The version of the song used in the show would later serve as the opening number of 1990's "Blond Ambition World Tour".
October 15 – Media Rings Corporation, the Japanese music, video game, and software publishing company, is founded in Akasaka.
December 23 – Ice Cube leaves N.W.A after financial problems and several conflicts with their manager Jerry Heller and the group's founder Eazy-E. By this time, Cube has been recording his solo debut album, which will be released next year.

Also in 1989
 Iron Maiden guitarist Adrian Smith leaves the band and is replaced by ex-Gillan guitarist Janick Gers who had most recently worked with Bruce Dickinson on his solo project.
 Ars Musica, an annual contemporary music international festival, founded
 The swing revival is generally agreed upon to have begun in 1989.

Bands formed
See Musical groups established in 1989

Bands disbanded
See Musical groups disestablished in 1989

Bands reformed

Cluster
Luv'
Plasmatics

Albums released
All releases are an LP record unless otherwise stated. 
Multiple entries for the same day are arranged alphabetically by the album's name. 
Release dates may vary in different countries.

January–March

April–June

July–September

October–December

Release date unknown

A Word from the Wise – Pennywise (EP)
Ain't Gonna Cry – Juice Newton
Al Denson – Al Denson
All Aboard the Mind Train – The Modern Art
All or Nothing – Milli Vanilli 
All That Jazz – Ella Fitzgerald
Animal Logic - Animal Logic
At Peace – Jade Warrior
Avalon Sunset – Van Morrison 
Best of Ozz – Ozzy Osbourne (Compilation)
Beyond Hell's Gate – Final Axe
Big Talk – Edin-Ådahl
Blast – Holly Johnson
Blow – Red Lorry Yellow Lorry
Bringing It Back Home – The Clark Sisters
Brotherly Love – Daniel Winans
Cantemos Juntos – Lynda Thomas (EP)
Christmas Is... – Johnny Maestro & the Brooklyn Bridge
Complete Discography – Minor Threat 
Century Flower – Shelleyan Orphan
Come Together As One – Will Downing
The Complete Sham 69 Live – Sham 69
Cyborgs Revisited – Simply Saucer
Desert Wind – Ofra Haza
Different – Thomas Anders
Don't Dance with Danger - Scarlet Red
Door Into Summer - Jacob's Trouble
Down on the River - John Hartford
Drowning in Limbo – Lydia Lunch
Early Music – Santana
Enter the Realm – Iced Earth (demo EP)
Face of Despair – Mortal Sin
Fight the Power... Live! – Public Enemy – (live, released on VHS)
FIrst Watch – Guardian (band)
Freedom – White Heart
Funk-O-Metal Carpet Ride – Electric Boys 
Get Yer Jujus Out – Chief Commander Ebenezer Obey & His Inter-Reformers Band
Getahead – Curiosity Killed the Cat
Ghostbusters II – Various Artists 
Godhead – Lowlife
Hallelujah – Happy Mondays
Hard Volume – Rollins Band
Heroes – New Jersey Mass Choir
Helter Stupid – Negativland
Human Soul - Graham Parker
I Remember Mama – Shirley Caesar
I Can See You – Black Flag
Immigrant's Daughter – Margaret Becker
In Your Face – Shout
Innocent Blood – REZ
It's a Jungle Out There! - Mastedon
Jaya – Jaya
Just Like Heaven – Dinosaur Jr.
Knights of Heaven – Leviticus
Les Rythmes Automatiques (fr) – Telex
Liaison – Liaison
Live ED – Étienne Daho
Liberation – Bunny Wailer
Long Way From Paradise – Allies
Master's Command – Sacred Warrior
Michigan Rain – Gregg Alexander (debut)
Modern – Hijokaidan
Mother Nature's Kitchen – Kevin McDermott
Never Picture Perfect – Rich Mullins
Night of Rage – Kraut
Niki Nana – Yanni
No More Blues – Susannah McCorkle
No Room in the Middle – Greg X. Volz
On Fire – Galaxie 500
Once We Were Scum, Now We Are God – No
Out of the Darkness – Bloodgood
Outdoor Elvis – The Swirling Eddies
Ozma – Melvins
Piretos tou erota – Vicky Leandros
The Pledge – DeGarmo and Key
Post-Mersh Vol. 3 – Minutemen
Powertrip – Ludichrist (final album)
Prime 5 – Ween
Rasta Souvenir – Manu Dibango
Rage of Angels – Rage of Angels
Return of the Ugly – Bad Manners
The Road to Hell – Chris Rea 
Rockland – Kim Mitchell
Sittin' Pretty – The Pastels
Stronger – Cliff Richard
Samiam – Samiam
Searchlight – Runrig
Silence is Madness – Bride
The Singular Adventures of The Style Council: Greatest Hits Vol.1 – The Style Council – (Compilation)
Smash – One Bad Pig
Some Disenchanted Evening – The Verlaines
Something Inside So Strong – Kenny Rogers
State of Control – Barren Cross
Special – The Temptations
Strange Cargo – David Van Tieghem
Special – The Temptations
Start Today - Gorilla Biscuits
Strong Medicine – Bryan Duncan
The Symphony Sessions – Red Rider
Tragedy Again – D.I.
Tweez – Slint
The Twelve Commandments of Dance – London Boys
Veuillez rendre l'âme (à qui elle appartient) – Noir Désir
The Way Home – Russ Taff
Western Shadows – Carole Laure
Workbook (album) - Bob Mould
Wrong – Nomeansno
Yellow Moon – The Neville Brothers 
You Can Fly – Steven Prince Band

Biggest hit singles
The following songs achieved the highest chart positions
in the charts of 1989.

Top 40 Chart hit singles

Other Chart hit singles

Notable singles

Other Notable singles

Published popular music
 "Kiss the Girl" m. Alan Menken, w. Howard Ashman, from The Little Mermaid
 "Part of Your World" m. Alan Menken, w. Howard Ashman, from The Little Mermaid
 "Under the Sea" m. Alan Menken, w. Howard Ashman, from The Little Mermaid
 "We Didn't Start the Fire" w.m. Billy Joel
 "You Got It"     w.m. Roy Orbison, Jeff Lynne & Tom Petty

Classical music
Elliott Carter
Three Occasions for Orchestra (1986–89)
Violin Concerto
Peter Maxwell Davies – Symphony No. 4
Kaija Saariaho - Du cristal...
Anders Eliasson – Symphony No. 3, for alto saxophone and orchestra
Einar Englund – Wind Quintet
Karel Goeyvaerts
Aquarius, stage cantata, for eight sopranos and 15 instrumentalists
...want de tijd is nabij (Because the Time Is Near), for male chorus and strings
Ingram Marshall – Sinfonia Dolce far Niente
Toshirô Mayuzumi
Mukyūdō, for orchestra
Rokudan, for harp
John McCabe – String Quartet No. 5
Einojuhani Rautavaara – Piano Concerto No. 2
Robert Simpson
String Quartet No. 13
Vortex for Brass Band
John Tavener – The Protecting Veil
I Nyoman Windha – Puspanjali

Opera
Conrad Cummings – Photo-Op
Anthony Davis – Under the Double Moon
Lorenzo Ferrero
Charlotte Corday
Le Bleu-blanc-rouge et le noir
Alexander Vustin – The Devil in Love (opera) (not performed)

Jazz

Musical theatre
 Aspects of Love (Andrew Lloyd Webber) – London production
 City of Angels – Broadway production opened at the Virginia Theatre and ran for 897 performances
 Grand Hotel – Broadway production opened at the Martin Beck Theatre and ran for 1017 performances
 Gypsy (Jule Styne and Stephen Sondheim) – Broadway revival
 Meet Me in St. Louis – Broadway production based on the 1944 film, ran for 252 performances
 Miss Saigon (Claude-Michel Schönberg and Alain Boublil) – London production
 Pacific Overtures (Stephen Sondheim and John Weidman) – London production
 Starmites (Stuart Ross and Barry Keating) - Broadway production opened at Criterion Center Stage Right and ran for 60 performances

Musical films
 101-Depeche Mode
 Eddie and the Cruisers II: Eddie Lives!
 The Fabulous Baker Boys
 ChaalBaaz
 Juke-Bar (animation)
 The Little Mermaid — animated feature film
 Little Nemo: Adventures in Slumberland
 Polly (TV film)
 Sons of Steel

Births
January 3 – Julia Nunes, American singer-songwriter
January 4 – Labrinth, English singer-songwriter, musician, rapper and record producer
January 7 – Wrabel, American singer-songwriter 
January 9 – Kyle Craft, American southern blues glam rock singer-songwriter and musician
January 13 – Triinu Kivilaan, Estonian singer and model
January 14 – Frankie Sandford, British singer-songwriter (S Club Juniors, The Saturdays)
January 16 – Kiesza, Canadian singer-songwriter and multi instrumentalist 
January 20 – Joel Pott, English musician (Shura)
January 24 
 Calvin Goldspink, British singer (S Club Juniors)
 Trace Cyrus, American musician (The Cyrus Family (Miley Cyrus, Billy Ray Cyrus, Noah Cyrus)) (Metro Station) 
January 25 – Yasmien Kurdi, Filipina singer and actress
January 28 – Carly Paoli, British mezzo-soprano
February 2 - Southside (record producer), American record producer, songwriter and rapper.
February 3 – Ryne Sanborn, American actor, singer and dancer
February 10 – Olga Korsak, Latvian singer-songwriter, actress, and former competitive figure skater
February 16 
 Danielle Haim, American multi-instrumentalist, singer and songwriter (Haim)
 Bry (singer), Irish singer-songwriter 
February 17 
 Stacey McClean, British singer (S Club Juniors)
 Chord Overstreet,  American actor, Glee cast member, singer, musician and composer
March 14. - Yutaka Yamada, Japanese composer, arranger and orchestrator 
March 20 - Sam de Jong, record producer, songwriter, and multi-instrumentalist from Auckland, New Zealand based in Los Angeles, California. (Ella Henderson, Amy Shark) 
February 22 – Anna Sundstrand, Swedish singer and model
February 24 – Lauren Brant, South African-Australian television personality, singer-dancer and actress
February 27
Sam Sweeney, English folk musician
Shota Shimizu, Japanese singer
March 1 
Sonya Kitchell, American jazz singer-songwriter
Karl-Erik Taukar, Estonian singer, bass guitarist and television host
March 9 – TaeYeon, member of South Korean pop girl group Girls' Generation
March 11 – Shin Soohyun, member of South Korean pop boy group U-KISS 
March 21 – Rochelle Wiseman, British singer (S Club Juniors & The Saturdays)
March 23 – Mike Will Made It, American record producer, rapper, singer and songwriter (Miley Cyrus, Kendrick Lamar) 
March 25 – Alyson Michalka, American singer-songwriter and actress
March 29 - Michelle Zauner,  Korean-American singer, musician, director, and author.
March 30 – Eden xo, American singer-songwriter and actress
July 14 – Isaiah Sharkey, American guitarist and singer
April 8 
Alexander DeLeon, American singer-songwriter (The Cab)
 Matt Healy, British singer-songwriter, musician of The 1975 (halsey, Taylor Swift)
Hitomi Takahashi, Japanese rock singer
April 11 – Zola Jesus, American singer/songwriter
April 18 – Jessica, member of Girls' Generation
 April 24 – Thomas Sanders, American singer, songwriter, youtuber, playwright, scriptwriter and internet personality (Dodie, Joan, Ben J Pierce)
May 1 – Tim Urban, American singer-songwriter and guitarist
May 3 – Mary Lambert (singer), American country singer/songwriter and poet
May 5 – Chris Brown, American
May 9 – Katy B, English singer and songwriter
May 15 – Sunny, member of Girls' Generation
May 24 – G-Eazy, American rapper, producer, singer (Britney Spears, Bebe Rexha, Halsey)
May 28 – Asuca Hayashi, J-pop singer
May 30 – Kevin Covais, American Idol finalist
June 3 – Jillette Johnson, American singer/songwriter, musician
June 9 – Chloë Agnew,  Irish multi lingual singer and songwriter (Celtic Women) 
June 13 – Lisa Tucker, American singer
June 14 – Lucy Hale, American actress and singer
June 17 – Simone Battle, American actress, singer and dancer (G.R.L) (died 2014)
June 18 – Renee Olstead, American actress and jazz singer
June 20 
 Benyamin Nuss, German pianist
 Christopher Mintz-Plasse, American actor, comedian and musician
June 25 - Sam Ryder (singer), British singer-songwriter 
June 27 – Kelley Jakle, American actress and singer-songwriter
July 2 – Dev (singer), American singer-songwriter, rapper, model, musician and radio host
July 3 – Elle King, America singer-songwriter
July 5 – Joseph King, American singer-songwriter and guitarist (Canvas and Deadbeat Darling)
July 6 - Laith Ashley, American model, actor, activist, singer-songwriter and entertainer of Dominican descent. (Taylor Swift, 
July 10 - Jennifer Åkerman, Swedish, blogger, model and singer-songwriter
July 11 – Hana Pestle,  American singer, songwriter and record producer (HANA) (Collaborator with Grimes and band member) 
 TĀLĀ – musician, singer-songwriter, record producer 
July 13 – Sayumi Michishige, Japanese musician and longest running member of Morning Musume
July 20 – Brooke Candy, American rapper,  singer-songwriter, director, activist, and dancer
July 21 – Jasmine Cephas Jones, American stage and screen actress-singer
July 26 – Travis Garland, American singer and dancer 
July 31 – Alexis Knapp, American actress and singer 
August 1 – Tiffany, member of Girls' Generation
August 2 
 Priscilla Betti, French singer
 Jonas Blue, English DJ, record producer, songwriter and remixer
 Relja Popović, serbian rapper and actor
August 4 – Jessica Mauboy,  Australian singer, songwriter and actress (Young Divas) 
August 9 - Tainy, Puetro Rico record producer
August 15
Belinda Peregrin, Spanish Mexican singer, songwriter and actress
Joe Jonas, American vocalist, singer/songwriter, musician (DNCE, Jonas Brothers) {AJ Michalka, Taylor Swift, Sophie Turner}
August 17 - Mitchell Tenpenny, American country pop singer and songwriter from Nashville, Tennessee.
August 18 – Anna Akana, American actress, musician, filmmaker, author, youtuber and comedian. 
August 19
Lil' Romeo, American entertainer
Runtown, Nigerian singer
August 21 – Hayden Panettiere, American actress, model, singer and activist
August 23 – Lianne La Havas, British singer, songwriter and multi-instrumentalist
August 30 – Bebe Rexha, American singer/songwriter, record producer  
September 1 – Bill and Tom Kaulitz of Tokio Hotel
September 2 – Zedd, Russian-German record producer, DJ, musician, multi-instrumentalist and songwriter (Foxes, Hayley Williams, Selena Gomez, Kesha)
September 4 – Ryota Kohama, Japanese musician (One Ok Rock)
September 7 – Loren Allred, American musician
September 8 – Avicii, Swedish musician, DJ, remixer and record producer (d. 2018)
September 10 – Sanjaya Malakar, American Idol finalist
September 14 – Logan Henderson, Actor, singer  (Big Time Rush)
September 21 
 Jason Derulo, American singer/songwriter/dancer 
 Emma Watkins, Australian singer, actress, and dancer
September 22 
 HyoYeon, member of Girls' Generation
 Cœur de pirate, Canadian bilingual singer-songwriter and musician 
September 24 – Kreayshawn,  American rapper, creative director of OK 1984 and music video director 
September 25 - Vick Hope,  British TV and radio presenter, journalist and published author. 
October 4 
 Rich Homie Quan, American singer, songwriter and rapper
 Tei Shi,  Colombian-Canadian singer, songwriter, and record producer
October 15 – Fedez, Italian rapper and musician (Zara Larsson)
October 20 – Jess Glynne, English soul-pop singer/songwriter
October 22 – JPEGMafia, American rapper, songwriter, and producer
October 30 – Jay Asforis, British singer (S Club Juniors)
November 2 – Katelyn Tarver, American singer-songwriter and actress
November 3 – Paula DeAnda, American singer-songwriter
November 11 – Reina Tanaka, Japanese pop singer (Morning Musume)
November 17 – Ali Tamposi, American songwriter
November 22 – Candice Glover, American R&B singer and actress
November 30 – Daisy Evans, British singer (S Club Juniors)
December 5 – Yuri, member of Girls' Generation
December 12 
Janelle Arthur, American singer
Marcel "Shin" Gothow of Cinema Bizarre, German drummer
December 13 – Taylor Swift, American singer-songwriter, musician, multi instrumentalist and businesswoman, sometimes actress 
December 17 – Taylor York, American musician, songwriter and guitarist (Paramore, Hayley Williams)
December 22 – Jordin Sparks, American Idol Season 6 winner
December 27 – Calyssa Davidson, American violinist
December 29 - Pardison Fontaine, American rapper and songwriter (Cardi B, Megan thee Stallion) 
December 31 – Andrew Taggart, producer and vocal (The Chainsmokers)
Unknown: 
Jihae, South Korean singer and actress
 Miya Folick, American Musician 
 Danny L Harle, British Music producer
 Jai Paul, English songwriter, record producer and recording artist

Deaths
January 12 – Chellapilla Satyam, Indian film music director, 65
January 20 – Beatrice Lillie, Canadian actress and singer, 94
January 21 – Billy Tipton, American jazz musician, 74
February 5 – Joe Raposo, composer and lyricist, "Bein' Green", 51 (non-Hodgkin's lymphoma)
February 6 – King Tubby Jamaican DJ and composer, father of dub reggae, 48 (gunshot wounds)
February 14 – Vincent Crane (The Crazy World of Arthur Brown), 45 (drug overdose)
February 23 – Florencio Morales Ramos, singer and composer, 72
March 19 – Alan Civil, horn player, 59
March 20 – Archie Bleyer, US arranger and bandleader, 79
April 8 – A. M. Rajah, Indian playback singer and composer, 59 (rail accident)
April 26 – Lucille Ball, US actress and singer, 77
May 9 – Keith Whitley, American singer, guitarist, and producer, 34
May 10 – Woody Shaw, jazz musician, 44 (kidney failure)
May 15 – Johnny Green, composer, conductor and arranger, 80
May 30 – Zinka Milanov, operatic soprano, 83
June 2 – Guido Agosti, Italian pianist and piano teacher, 87
June 14 – Pete de Freitas, drummer with Echo & the Bunnymen, 27 (motorcycle accident)
June 22 – Henri Sauguet, composer, 88
June 24 – Hibari Misora, Japanese enka singer, 52 (hepatitis)
July 5 – Ernesto Halffter, Spanish composer and conductor, 84
July 16 – Herbert von Karajan, conductor, 81
July 21 – Mushtaq Ali Khan, Indian sitar, surbahar and pakhawaj player, 78
August 1 – John Ogdon, pianist, 52 (diabetes-related)
August 2 – Luiz Gonzaga, Brazilian musician, 76
August 21 – Raul Seixas, singer and songwriter, 44 (diabetes-related)
August 25 – Gunnar Berg, Danish composer 
September 7 – Mikhail Goldstein, violinist and composer, 71
September 14 – Perez Prado, Cuban bandleader and composer, 72
September 15 – Jan DeGaetani, mezzo-soprano, 56 (leukemia)
September 22 – Irving Berlin, composer, lyricist, 101
September 24 – Jean Perrin, pianist and composer, 79
September 30 – Virgil Thomson, composer, 92
October 17 – Morteza Hannaneh, composer, 66
October 19 – Alan Murphy, guitarist, member of Level 42 and Go West, 35 (AIDS-related)
October 22 – Ewan MacColl, folk singer, 74
October 31 – Conrad Beck, Swiss composer, 88
November 5 – Vladimir Horowitz, pianist, 86
November 15 – Alejo Durán, composer of vallenatos, 80
December 6
Billy Lyall, keyboardist of Pilot and Bay City Rollers, 46 (AIDS-related)
Sammy Fain, US composer, 87
December 21 – Ján Cikker, Slovak composer, 78
December 26 – Sir Lennox Berkeley, composer, 86

Awards
The following artists are inducted into the Rock and Roll Hall of Fame: Dion, Otis Redding, The Rolling Stones, The Temptations and Stevie Wonder
Grammy Awards of 1989
1989 Country Music Association Awards
Eurovision Song Contest 1989
31st Japan Record Awards

Charts
List of Hot 100 number-one singles of 1989 (U.S.)

See also
 1989 in British music
 Record labels established in 1989

References

External links
ARIA Top 50 Singles of 1989

 
20th century in music
Music by year